The Coreca Reefs form a group of rocks of Italy located in the Tyrrhenian Sea, in Calabria in the Frazione of Coreca.

They are a group of ten rocks: Capoto (the largest of them), Formica, Ginario, Longarino, Piccirillo, Tirolé (also known as Pirolé) and the four Scuagli da Funtana have a distribution area from the nearby "La Tonnara" at the edge of the sea air of Coreca's main village.

During the 1960s, 1970s and 1980s, it was a destination for radio-amateurs and cameramen, and meta of environmental events such as the LIPU for the vast marine ornithological fauna that had completely disappeared now.

It administratively belongs to Amantea, the Italian municipality of the province of Cosenza.

See also
Coreca Caves

Notes

References

Reefs of Italy